Wildwood is a bounded locality in Victoria, Australia,  north-west of Melbourne's central business district, located within the City of Hume local government area.

Wildwood is bounded by Konagaderra Road in the north, by Emu Creek in the west, Deep Creek in the east and by the point of confluence of the streams in the south.

See also
 Shire of Bulla – Wildwood was previously within this former local government area.

References

External links

 Wildwood/Clarkefield Profile (Hume City Council)

Towns in Victoria (Australia)
City of Hume